Barbara Szabó (born 17 February 1990) is a Hungarian athlete specialising in the high jump. She represented her country at the 2013 World Championships without qualifying for the final. Her best outing so far is the eighth place at the European Indoor Championships. She competed at the 2016 Summer Olympics.

She studied at the Western State Colorado University.

Her personal bests in the event are 1.92 metres outdoors (Marseille 2015) and 1.93 metres indoors (Budapest 2015).

Competition record

References

External links
 
 
 
 
 

1990 births
Living people
Hungarian female high jumpers
World Athletics Championships athletes for Hungary
Western Colorado University alumni
Athletes (track and field) at the 2016 Summer Olympics
Olympic athletes of Hungary
Competitors at the 2013 Summer Universiade
Athletes from Budapest